Neoplan N407 was a midibus built by Neoplan, and was the smallest among the Neoplan N400-series buses. It was first showed in 1983, when for long time on German market there was no short low-capacity bus. The bus can carry 52 passengers on board, including 27 passengers with seats.

In 1986 model had frontwall facelift, the engine was replaced too although it is a bus produced as a midibus in between a minibus and a full-size single-decker.

Neoplan N407 is used on buslines with a little stream of passengers or in small cities.

In 1998 Greek manufacturer ELVO created its C97.N4007 bus model based on a Neoplan N407 chassis. The buses were delivered to ETHEL, the body providing bus services in Athens at the time, between 1998 and 2000 and are still in service.

Competitors 
 MAN Lion's City M
 Volvo B6
 Optare MetroRider
 Dennis Dart

References 
 Stiasny Marcin, Atlas autobusów, Poznan Railway Modellers Club, Poland 2008

Buses
Neoplan
Low-floor buses
Midibuses
Vehicles introduced in 1989